This is a list of places of worship in Cardiff, capital city of Wales.

Currently active

Buddhist

Cardiff Buddhist Centre, Roath
Kagyu Samye Dzong, Canton

Christian

Baptist Union of Great Britain

Albany Road Baptist Church, Roath Park
Alfred Tilly Memorial Baptist Church (Rumney Baptist Church), Rumney
Ararat, Whitchurch
Belmont, Tremorfa
Bethany, Rhiwbina
Bethel, Whitchurch
Calvary, Canton
Christchurch United Church, Llanedeyrn
Cornwall Street Baptist Church, Grangetown
Ely (Archer Rd) Baptist, The Church on the Roundabout, Ely
Grangetown Baptish Church, Grangetown
Llanishen Baptist Church, Llanishen
Lisvane Baptist Church, Lisvane
Pentyrch Street, Cathays
Siloam, Llanrumney
Splott Baptist Church, Splott
Tredegarville Baptist Church, Roath, also used by Life Church Cardiff
Woodville Baptist Church, Cathays

Baptist Union of Wales

Tabernacl, city centre

Church of Jesus Christ of Latter-day Saints

Church of Jesus Christ of Latter-day Saints, Rhiwbina

Church in Wales

Llandaff Cathedral, Llandaff
All Saints', Llandaff North
All Saints', Rhiwbina
Christ Church, Roath Park
Christ Church, Radyr
St Andrew and St Teilo, Cathays, operating as Citizen Church
St Augustine's, Rumney
St Catherine's, Canton
St David's, Caerau
St Denys', Lisvane
Dewi Sant, city centre – formerly St Andrew's 
St Dyfrig and St Samson, Grangetown (also used by the Romanian Orthodox Parish of St Stephen)
St Edward the Confessor, Roath
St Edeyrn's, Old St Mellons
St Faith's, Llanishen
St German's, Adamsdown
St Isan's, Llanishen
St John the Baptist, city centre – one of the two churches of medieval Cardiff, with St Mary's.

St John the Baptist, Danescourt
St John the Evangelist, Canton (also used by the Russian Orthodox Church Outside of Russia Parish of the Kazan Icon of The Mother of God)
St Luke's, Canton
St Margaret's, Roath
St Mark's, Gabalfa
St Martin's Roath
St Mary's Whitchurch
St Mary the Virgin, Butetown
St Michael and All Angels, Cathays
St Paul's, Grangetown
St Philip, Tremorfa
Church of the Resurrection, Ely
St Saviour's, Splott
St Thomas's, Birchgrove
St Timothy's, Caerau

Ecumenical churches and shared churches

Canton Uniting Church, Canton (Baptist Union of Great Britain and United Reformed Church)
Christchurch, Llandaff North (shared by Methodist and United Reformed churches)
Christchurch, Fairwater (shared by Methodist and United Reformed churches)
St David's Ecumenical Church, Pentwyn (Baptist Union of Great Britain, Church in Wales and United Reformed Church)
Llanrumney Community Church, Llanrumney (shared by Rhiwbina Baptist Church and New Hope Community Church)
Pontprennau Community Church, Pontprennau (Baptist, Church in Wales, Methodist and United Reformed Church)
The Church of the Resurrection, St Mellons

Elim Pentecostal Church

City Church, Riverside
The Beacon Church, St Mellons

Evangelical Lutheran Church of England

St David's, Fairwater

Evangelical Presbyterian Church in England and Wales

Bethel, Culverhouse Cross
Immanuel, Caerau

Gospel Halls

Adamsdown Gospel Hall, Adamsdown
Canton Gospel Hall, Canton
Ebenezer Gospel Hall, Grangetown
Fairwater Gospel Hall, Fairwater
Heath Gospel Hall, Heath
Leckwith Gospel Hall (The Church in the Avenue), Canton

Greek Orthodox Church

St Nicholas's Church, Butetown

Independent Baptist

Ainon, Tongwynlais
Cornwall Street Baptist Church, Grangetown
Emmanuel, Gabalfa
Gabalfa Baptist Church, Gabalfa
St Mellons (Caersalem) Baptist Church, St Mellons
Rhiwbina Baptist Church, Rhiwbina

Jehovah's Witnesses

Kingdom Hall, Gabalfa
Kingdom Hall, Llanrumney

Methodist Church

St Andrew's, Birchgrove (also used by Seventh-day Adventist Church)
Cathays Methodist Church, Cathays
Copleston Road Methodist Church, Llandaff North
Cyncoed Methodist Church, Cyncoed
Conway Road Pontcanna (also used by German Lutheran Church and the Russian Orthodox parish of St Theodore & St Teilo)
Ely Methodist, Ely
Llanishen Methodist Church, Llanishen
St Paul's, Butetown
Radyr Methodist, Radyr
Rumney Methodist Church, Rumney
Wesley Methodist, Canton
Whitchurch Methodist, Whitchurch

Presbyterian Church of Wales

Cathedral Road, Pontcanna
Fairwater Church, Fairwater
Park End, Cyncoed
Tabernacle, Whitchurch
Saltmead Hall, Grangetown

Quakers

Friends Meeting House, city centre

Roman Catholic Church

Cardiff Metropolitan Cathedral (St David's Cathedral), city centre
St Alban-on-the-Moors, Splott
Blessed Sacrament, Rumney
St Brigid's, Llanishen
St Cadoc's Church, Llanrumney
Christ the King, Llanishen
St Clare's, Ely
St Francis of Assisi, Ely
Holy Family, Fairwater
St John Lloyd, Rumney
St Joseph's, Gabalfa
St Mary of the Angels, Canton
Our Lady of Lourdes, Llandaff North
St Patrick's, Grangetown
St Paul's, Cyncoed
St Peter's, Plasnewydd
St Philip Evans, Llanedeyrn
St Teilo's, Whitchurch
University Catholic Chaplaincy

Salvation Army

The Salvation Army, Canton
The Salvation Army, Cathays
The Salvation Army, Ely
The Salvation Army, Grangetown
The Salvation Army, Splott

Union of Welsh Independents

Eglwys Minny Street, Cathays

United Reformed Church

St Andrews, Roath
Bethel, Llanishen
Bethesda, Tongwynlais
Beulah, Rhiwbina
City United Reformed Church, city centre
Parkminster United Reformed Church, Roath (also used by Calvary Church of God in Christ)

Other denominations and independent churches

All Nations Church, Heath
Bethania, St Mellons
Bethesda, Rhiwbina
Cardiff Chinese Christian Church, Canton
Church of God, Canton
Ebenezer Church, Grangetown
Eglwys y Crwys, Cathays
Eglwys Efengylaidd Gymraeg Caerdydd (Cardiff Welsh Evangelical Church), Cathays
Freedom Church, Butetown
Garden of the Lord, Tremorfa
Glenwood Church, Llanedeyrn
Heath Evangelical Church, Gabalfa, also holds services of the Cardiff Korean Church.
Highfields Church, Cathays
International Church, Cathays
Llandaff North Christian Centre, Llandaff North (formerly Llandaff North Gospel Hall)
Llanishen Evangelical Church, Llanishen (formerly Emmaus Chapel)
Mackintosh Evangelical Church, Roath
Minster Christian Centre, Roath
New Hope Centre, Butetown
New Hope Community Church, Llanrumney
New Testament Church of God, Butetown
Rumney Gospel Chapel, Rumney
Salem, Canton
Shiloh Pentecostal Church, Riverside
The Redeemed Christian Church of God (RCCG) House of Praise, Cardiff
Tabernacle, Roath
Thornhill Church, Thornhill

Hindu

India Centre, Splott
Sanatan Dharma Mandal, city centre
Shree Swaminarayan Temple, Grangetown

Islam

Al Falah Centre, Riverside
Al-Manar Centre, Cathays
Dar-ul-Isra, Cathays
Grangetown Muslim Cultural Centre, Grangetown
Jalalia Mosque & Islamic Education Centre, Riverside
Jamia Masjid Bilal, Canton
Madina Mosque, Cathays
Masjid Noor, Butetown
Masjid-e-Umar, Roath
Shah Jalal Mosque & Islamic Cultural Centre, Cathays
South Wales Islamic Centre, Butetown

Judaism

Movement for Reform
Cardiff Reform Synagogue, Adamsdown

Orthodox

Cardiff United Synagogue, Cyncoed

Sikhism

Sri Dasmesh Singh Sabha Gurdwara Bhatra, Riverside
Sikh Gurdwara Temple, Roath

Notable defunct places of worship

All Souls Chapel, Cardiff, Cardiff Bay − a large chapel catering primarily to seamen (a converted ship had served in this capacity previously). Closed in 1952 and demolished.
St Anne's Church, Roath – designed by a pupil of William Burges it opened in 1887, but closed in December 2015 with a £250,000 repair bill looming.
St James the Great, Adamsdown – Built 1890-3, closed in 2006 with plans to convert it into apartments.
Lightship 2000, Cardiff Bay – a former lightship used as a church until 2013, with a minister from the United Reformed church.
St Mary's, city centre – Cardiff's main church from the 12th century until it was destroyed by flooding in the 17th century.
St Mary the Virgin, Caerau – 13th century church last used in 1973.
Norwegian Church, Cardiff Bay – de-consecrated in 1974, subsequently relocated and re-opened as an arts centre.
St Stephen's, Butetown – deconsecrated in 1972, subsequently becoming a theatre and live music venue until 2009.
St Teilo's, St Fagans – ancient church re-erected at St Fagans National History Museum
Wood Street Congregational Church, city centre – once the largest congregational chapel in South Wales. Demolished in the 1960s.

See also
List of cultural venues in Cardiff
List of places in Cardiff

References

Places of worship

Cardiff, list of places of worship